A piezometer is either a device used to measure liquid pressure in a system by measuring the height to which a column of the liquid rises against gravity, or a device which measures the pressure (more precisely, the piezometric head) of groundwater at a specific point. A piezometer is designed to measure static pressures, and thus differs from a pitot tube by not being pointed into the fluid flow.

Observation wells give some information on the water level in a formation, but must be read manually. Electrical pressure transducers of several types can be read automatically, making data acquisition more convenient.

Groundwater measurement

The first piezometers in geotechnical engineering were open wells or standpipes (sometimes called Casagrande piezometers)  installed into an aquifer. A Casagrande piezometer will typically have a solid casing down to the depth of interest, and a slotted or screened casing within the zone where water pressure is being measured. The casing is sealed into the drillhole with clay, bentonite or concrete to prevent surface water from contaminating the groundwater supply. In an unconfined aquifer, the water level in the piezometer would not be exactly coincident with the water table, especially when the vertical component of flow velocity is significant. In a confined aquifer under artesian conditions, the water level in the piezometer indicates the pressure in the aquifer, but not necessarily the water table. Piezometer wells can be much smaller in diameter than production wells, and a 5 cm diameter standpipe is common.

Piezometers in durable casings can be buried or pushed into the ground to measure the groundwater pressure at the point of installation. The pressure gauges (transducer) can be vibrating-wire, pneumatic, or strain-gauge in operation, converting pressure into an electrical signal. These piezometers are cabled to the surface where they can be read by data loggers or portable readout units, allowing faster or more frequent reading than is possible with open standpipe piezometers.

See also

Rheometer
Tensiometer (soil science)

References

Hydrology instrumentation
Hydraulic engineering
In situ geotechnical investigations